South March is a dispersed rural community in Kanata North Ward, in Ottawa, Ontario, Canada. The older community has been permeated by the newer Morgan's Grant subdivision, which has largely replaced it.

References

Neighbourhoods in Ottawa